Karl Konrad Ferdinand Maria von Amira (25 May 1863 – 14 December 1945) was a German jurist who served as Professor of Constitutional Law at the Ludwig Maximilian University of Munich. He was a known expert on early Germanic law.

Biography
Karl von Amira was born in Aschaffenburg, Germany on 8 March 1848. Gaining his abitur at the Wilhelmsgymnasium in Munich, von Amira studied law at the Ludwig Maximilian University of Munich. Among his teachers were Bernhard Windscheid, Julius Wilhelm von Planck,  and Alois von Brinz. He also studied North Germanic languages under Konrad Maurer. von Amira gained his Ph.D. at Munich in 1872 under the supervision of Maurer.

From 1875 to 1892, von Amira was Professor of German and Church Law at the University of Freiburg. Since 1892, von Amira was Professor of Constitutional Law at the Ludwig Maximilian University of Munich. von Amira specialized in the study of Early Germanic law and Medieval Roman law. He instrumental in the publishing of the Deutsches Rechtswörterbuch. He received the Bavarian Maximilian Order for Science and Art in 1902.

Selected works
 Das altnorwegische Vollstreckungsverfahren: Eine rechtsgeschichtliche Abhandlung. München 1874.
 Erbenfolge und Verwandtschaftsgliederung nach den alt-niederdeutschen Rechten. Ackermann, München 1874 (Digitalisat).
 Ueber Zweck und Mittel der germanischen Rechtsgeschichte. Akademische Antrittsrede. Ackermann, München 1876 (Digitalisat).
 Das Endinger Judenspiel (Herausgeberschaft). Halle 1883 (Digitalisat; DjVu).
 Thierstrafen und Thierprocesse. In: Mittheilungen des Instituts für österreichische Geschichtsforschung. 11. Band, 1891, S. 545–601. Separatdruck: Innsbruck 1891 (Digitalisat; PDF).
 Die Dresdner Bilderhandschrift des Sachsenspiegels. Erster Band: Facsimile der Handschrift. Leipzig 1902. Zweiter Band: Erläuterungen. Teil I, Leipzig 1925 und Teil II, Leipzig 1926.
 Die Handgebärden in den Bilderhandschriften des Sachsenspiegels (= Abhandlungen der Bayerischen Akademie der Wissenschaften. Philosophisch-Philologische und Historische Klasse; Bd. 23, 2). München 1905.
 Der Stab in der germanischen Rechtssymbolik (= Abhandlungen der Bayerischen Akademie der Wissenschaften. Philosophisch-Philologische und Historische Klasse; Band 25, 1). München 1909 (Rezension in der ZRG).
 Grundriß des germanischen Rechts (= Grundriß der Germanischen Philologie. Band 5). 3. Auflage. Strassburg 1913.
 Die Neubauersche Chronik (= Sitzungsberichte der Königlichen Bayerischen Akademie der Wissenschaften. Philosophisch-philologische und historische Klasse; Jg. 1918, 9). München 1918 (Digitalisat; DjVu).
 Die germanischen Todesstrafen. Untersuchungen zur Rechts- und Religionsgeschichte (= Abhandlungen der Bayerischen Akademie der Wissenschaften. Philosophisch-philologische und Historische Klasse; Bd. 31, 3). München 1922.
Rechtsarchäologie. 1. Einführung in die Rechtsarchäologie. Gegenstände, Formen und Symbole germanischen Rechts. Berlin 1943 (Digitalisat).

Sources

 Paul Puntschart: Karl von Amira und sein Werk. Böhlau, Weimar 1932.
 
 Peter Landau, Hermann Nehlsen, Mathias Schmoeckel (Hrsg.): Karl von Amira zum Gedächtnis (= Rechtshistorische Reihe, Band 206), Lang, Frankfurt am Main u. a. 1999, .
 Gerhard J. Bellinger, Brigitte Regler-Bellinger: Schwabings Ainmillerstrasse und ihre bedeutendsten Anwohner. Ein repräsentatives Beispiel der Münchner Stadtgeschichte von 1888 bis heute. Norderstedt 2003, S. 139–140, ; 2. Aufl. 2012, ; E-Book 2013, .
 Mathias Schmoeckel: Amira, Karl von (1848–1930). In: Albrecht Cordes, Heiner Lück, Dieter Werkmüller, Ruth Schmidt-Wiegand (Hrsg.): Handwörterbuch zur deutschen Rechtsgeschichte, 2., völlig überarbeitete und erweiterte Auflage, Band 1, Erich Schmidt Verlag, Berlin 2008, Sp. 200–202 (online, kostenpflichtig).
 Hermann Nehlsen: Karl von Amira (1848–1930). In: Katharina Weigand (Hrsg.): Münchner Historiker zwischen Politik und Wissenschaft. Utz, München 2010, S. 137–158.

1848 births
1930 deaths
German legal scholars
Germanic studies scholars
Ludwig Maximilian University of Munich alumni
Academic staff of the Ludwig Maximilian University of Munich
Members of the Royal Swedish Academy of Sciences
People from Aschaffenburg
Old Norse studies scholars
Academic staff of the University of Freiburg
Members of the Göttingen Academy of Sciences and Humanities
Members of the Royal Society of Sciences in Uppsala